The 2019 Summit League women's basketball tournament was a post-season women's basketball tournament for The Summit League. The tournament took place March 9–12, 2019, at the Denny Sanford Premier Center in Sioux Falls, South Dakota. The Top 8 teams in the final standings qualified for the tournament.

Seeds
The top eight teams by conference record in the Summit League are eligible to compete in the conference tournament. Teams are to be seeded by record within the conference, with a tiebreaker system to seed teams with identical conference records.
South Dakota State, South Dakota, Oral Roberts, Denver, Western Illinois, North Dakota, and North Dakota State, and Purdue Fort Wayne all qualified.

Schedule and results

Bracket

References

Summit League women's basketball tournament